The Eastern Desert (Archaically known as Arabia or the Arabian Desert) is the part of the Sahara desert that is located east of the Nile river. It spans  of North-Eastern Africa and is bordered by the Nile river to the west and the Red Sea and Gulf of Suez to the east. It extends through Egypt, Eritrea, Sudan and Ethiopia. The Eastern Desert is also known as the Red Sea Hills. The Desert consists of a mountain range which runs parallel to the coast, wide sedimentary plateaus extending from either side of the mountains and the Red Sea coast. The rainfall, climate, vegetation and animal life sustained in the desert varies between these different regions.The Desert has been a mining site for building materials, and precious and semi-precious metals throughout history. It has historically contained many trade routes leading to and from the Red Sea, including the Suez Canal.

Geography

Historical formation 
Between 100 and 35 million years ago the area that is now the Eastern Desert was underwater, covered by the Tethys Ocean. During the Oligocene period, around 34 million years ago, the land began to tilt and the coastline was pushed back to the north and west. Concurrently, the basement complex to the east was uplifted, forming the mountain range of the Desert. In this same sequence of land movements, a rift which is now the Red Sea was opened up.

Mountains 

The southern mountains are predominantly igneous rock while the mountains to the north are limestone. Separating the mountains are wide wadis which allow for the runoff of rainfall from the mountains to the Red Sea and the Nile River. Other significant peaks include Jebel Erba Jabal Oda, Jabal Shaib al Banat, Jebel Hamata, Gebel Amm Anad,  South Galala, and North Galala.

Plateaus 
Sedimentary plateaus run on either side of mountains. In general, the Northern sections of these plateaus have a limestone base while the Southern sections are sandstone. The plateaus between the Nile River and the mountains is also known as the inland Eastern Desert and is subdivided into four sections: The Cairo-Suez Desert, The Limestone Desert, The Sandstone (Idfu-Kom Ombo) Desert, and the Nubian Desert.

Red Sea coast 
The Red Sea coastland is the easternmost part of the Eastern Desert, running between Eritrea and the Gulf of Suez.

Climate 
The Eastern Desert has a semi-arid/arid/hyper-arid climate. Most of the rainfall occurs during the winter months around the mountains. The presence of the mountains can create a rain shadow, for the rest of the Desert, contributing to the arid environment.

The storms (khamsins) are caused by tropical air moving up from Sudan, accompanied by strong winds and an increased temperature. 'Khamsin' comes from the Arabic word meaning fifty, as the storms occur on an average of fifty days in a year.

Historic climate 
Carbon dating of samples of fossil tufas, a type of limestone which is deposited in the presence of high groundwater levels, has revealed that there have historically been two periods when the Eastern Desert was significantly wetter than it is today. These occurred in the late Pleistocene age, around 100,000 and the mid Holocene age, around 6000 years ago. The most recent wet period is known to be a result of summer monsoonal rains that moved over the Desert from the Indian Ocean. During these times, some areas of the land was swamp. The mountains and desert plateaus were also able to sustain more vegetation and animals. In between these periods the desert climate has remained mostly arid, as it is today.

Flora 
The vegetation growing in the Eastern Desert is classified as either ephemeral or perennial. Ephemeral vegetation are plants which usually have a single season lifespan due to their dependence on rain. Perennial plants live for two or more years.

Coastal vegetation 
There are three main ecosystems within the coastal region of the Eastern Desert: littoral salt marsh, coastal desert and coastal mountains. The presence of sea spray, tidal movements and salt water seepage means that vegetation in these areas must be well adapted to living in a saline environment.

Littoral salt marsh 
The salt marsh is created as mud builds up on tidal flats and plants grow on the mud, making it a more stable and permanent ecosystem. The two main types of vegetation in this area are mangrove and salt marsh vegetation.

Avicennia marina, or grey mangrove is the dominant mangrove plant in the Red Sea area. It grows consistently along a large stretch of the Red Sea coast but is rarely seen to the North of the Egyptian city, Hurghada. Rhizophora mucronata, or loop-root mangrove, also grows co-dominantly with A.Marina in some areas along the coast but it is less prevalent. The loop-root mangrove is taller than the grey mangrove and thus, in areas where they do grow together, they form a two-tiered canopy of leaves. Small plants such as Cymodocea ciliata and Halophila oualis typically form the undergrowth of the mangrove community.

Salt marsh 
The salt marsh vegetation is made up of a mix of shrub, succulent and grass species. The growth of these plants often creates the coastal dunes as the root systems hold the sand in place when other areas are left exposed to wind erosion.

Shrub communities

 Halocnemum strobilaceum is a woody sub-shrub which grows in the mud flats and on the sandy shoreline. It is most common on the northern section of the coast, near the Gulf of Suez.
 Arthrocaulon macrostachyum (syn. Arthrocnemum glaucum) is a flowering shrub which grows in similar areas to H. strobilaceum but is less prevalent in the North.
 Limonium pruinosum, also known as a species of sea lavender, grows commonly around the Gulf of Suez. Also from this family, the species of Limonium axillare contributes to up to 50% of vegetation cover on the South coast.
 Tamarix nilotica is a bush which grows in a variety of conditions along the Red Sea coast. The roots stabilise the sand to form dunes.

Succulent communities

 Zygophyllum album is a frequently occurring succulent community which is tolerant to different soil conditions and thus, is found all along the coast.
 Halopeplis perfoliata is a succulent species which commonly grows in the southern region of the Red Sea coast.
 Nitraria retusa and Suaeda monoica are succulent shrubs commonly located within the northern 700 km of the coast. They are separate communities but they grow together in the same area and they extend inland to the coastal desert plain area.
 Suaeda monoica grows in similar areas to N.retusa, however it is also found further south and is a common feature of the Eritrean and Sudanese coastal regions.

Grass communities

 Aeluropus brevifolius and Aeluropus lagopoides are two related species of creeping grasses which usually grows in dense patches all along the coast but are also known to form tall masses of interwoven roots and sand.
 Sporobolus spicatus, also known as salt grass, grows inland from A.brevifolius and A.lagopoides where sand deposits are deeper and the soil is less saline.
 Halopyrum mucronatum grows on hills and sand dunes. It is rare and is only found in a few locations along the coast.

Coastal desert 
Coastal desert vegetation grown in the band between the littoral salt marsh and the base of the coastal mountains. In comparison to the littoral salt marsh area, the soil is non-saline and arid. The growing vegetation relies on the drainage of water from the mountains via wadis. As a result, growth of plants is seasonal, unlike in the littoral salt marsh. A greater variety of vegetation also grows in the area compared to the salt marsh area. The ephemeral vegetation includes a mix of grasses, succulents and herbaceous plants. Perennial vegetation is made up of succulents, grasses and woody shrub species.

Coastal mountains 
The vegetation cover on the coastal mountains is more dense than on the coastal desert. There are over 400 plant species within the coastal mountains eco-system, including shrubs, herbs and ferns. The distribution of these species varies subtly as the altitude changes.

Inland desert 
The plants which grow on the inland plateaus vary greatly in their distribution and species due to the difference in sandstone and limestone rock bases and the varying amount of rain and runoff water from the wadis.

Fauna 

The wildlife of the Eastern Desert is quite different from that of the Western Desert, as the presence of the Nile River and the Red Sea Mountains provide variable eco-regions. Small mammals such as the fennec fox, golden spiny mouse, bushy-tailed jird, jerboa and other rodents live in the on the plateaus of the Desert. Other larger mammals include the hyrax, Egyptian mongoose and the Egyptian wolf. The Red Sea Hills provide a unique mountainous habitat which increases the diversity of fauna in the Eastern Desert. Species found in the mountains include the aoudad, a mountain dwelling species of sheep, the Nubian ibex and the Dorcus gazelle. The mountain range also provides a habitat for a variety of birdlife including the golden eagle and the bearded vulture, which are rarely found in any other areas of the Sahara. The Nile Valley is a central location for bird migration and there are more than 200 species of birds which pass through the western side of the Eastern desert during the migration seasons.

Natural resources and mining 
The mining of precious metals dates back to Ancient Egyptian times and has carried on in the Eastern Desert until present day. From the early Pharaonic era (3000 BC), copper and gold were mined from the Desert and used to make tools and for jewellery and embellishment. It was not until much later, around 1000 BC, that iron was also discovered and began to be mined. Wadis were used as routes to cart the mined materials back to the civilisation. There were also mines for precious rocks such as emeralds and amethysts that were discovered by the Ancient Egyptians, and used during the Roman and Islamic periods. As well as precious materials, valuable building and sculpting materials have also been mined from the Eastern desert such as limestone, granite and marble. Today, most of the mining that occurs in and around the Eastern Desert is for crude oil and natural gas.

History 
The earliest signs of humans in the desert was found in the form of flint tools from 250,000 BC.

The Mesolithic Period (10,000–5,000 BC) 
Around 25,000 BC, the land underwent significant climatic change which transformed the grassy plains into desert. This made the land much less habitable and, as a result of this change, nomads which had inhabited the land that is now the Eastern Desert were driven towards the Nile River.

Pharaonic Egypt (3000–30 BC) 
Trade routes from the Nile to the Red sea were established through the Desert. Notably, there was a route between the Nile River and Mersa Gawasis, an Ancient Egyptian port. There were also many mines and quarries along this route. Boats were carried in pieces across the desert through the wadis and then set up once they reached the port to embark on expeditions. The Ancient Egyptians exploited the desert resources of copper, gold, iron and precious stones. As well as for trade, they used these resources to improve their society and in their burials.

Roman Period (30 BC – 395 CE) 
Commercial trade increased further during this time and more trade routes were established across the desert. Red Sea ports were points of embarkation for trade with India. During the Ptolemaic and Roman period the chief port was Berenice Troglodytica, and the Via Hadriana led from Berenice to Antinoöpolis on the Nile. Items being traded diversified during this period to include goods such as fabrics and pearls. "Imperial Porphyry" was quarried at Mons Claudianus into the Byzantine era. The Romans set up multiple ports along the red sea coast to transport materials. Roman soldiers lived and worked at these ports. Their main sources of food were pigs, donkeys and camels.

Today 

The Eastern Desert it a popular site for tours, safaris and other expeditions. Mining also still occurs in the Desert.

Gallery

See also
 Anthony the Great
 Geography of Egypt
 Libyan/Western Desert

Citations

General bibliography 
 
 Barnard, H., & Duistermaat, K. (2012). The history of the peoples of the Eastern Desert. University of California.
 Eastern Desert - Peakbagger.com. Peakbagger.com. (2021). Retrieved 23 April 2021, from https://www.peakbagger.com/range.aspx?rid=614.
 Egypt – The Eastern Desert. (2021). Retrieved from https://www.britannica.com/place/Egypt/The-Eastern-Desert
 Hoath, R. (2009). Field guide to the mammals of Egypt. The American University in Cairo Press.
 
 Sanders, D. (2017). Mining Resources in Ancient Egypt. Retrieved from https://sciencing.com/mining-resources-ancient-egypt-11732.html
 
 Van der Veen, M., Bouchaud, C., Cappers, R., & Newton, C. (2021). The Eastern Desert of Egypt during the Greco-Roman period: archaeological reports. College de France. https://orcid.org/0000-0003-4834-0269

External links

 National Parks of Egypt 

 Histories By Herodotus 

Deserts of Egypt
Deserts of Eritrea
Deserts of Ethiopia
Deserts of Sudan
Fauna of Egypt
Flora of Egypt
Red Sea
Sahara